Daniel Landau (born 1 March 1973) is an Israeli entrepreneur,
artist,
and researcher.
His work in the field of virtual reality has been presented in museums, festivals, and conferences

worldwide.
Landau is involved in the Israeli startup scene,

developing behavioral assessment and learning

tools using virtual reality.

Biography
Daniel Landau was born and raised in Jerusalem.
He completed his Master's degree at the Royal Conservatory of The Hague. During his studies, Landau wrote music for Dutch contemporary music ensembles, such as Nieuw Ensemble, Orkest de Volharding, and Slagwerkgroep Den Haag, performing his works at concert halls and festivals, including The Concertgebouw and Paradiso Festival.

In 2001, Landau established the art collective BZAZ Foundation, which created full-length media shows. These shows toured Germany, Hungary, Belgium, Mexico, Spain, England, and Israel, receiving positive reviews by media and audiences.

Landau lived in the Netherlands for ten years and returned to Israel in 2006. He then began work on a performance platform based on projection and movement.

In 2008, in collaboration with artists, dancers, engineers, and designers, Landau created the British-Israeli stage production One-Dimensional Man. The show was a direct continuation of Landau's interest in the relationship between the human body and technology. It took place at the Suzanne Dellal Center for Dance and Theater, receiving positive reviews. Landau also created a series of works called 'Reside', using a docu-performance platform that he had established.

In 2014, Landau established the 'Oh-Man, Oh-Machine' platform, through which he initiates international conferences, workshops, salon meetings, and a  research group  intended to promote a techno-social critical discourse using the philosophical framework of Posthumanism. In 2013–2015, he served as head of digital media studies at The Midrasha Faculty of the Arts, Beit Berl Academic College, Israel.

Landau is currently serving as a senior research fellow at the Advanced Virtuality Lab (AVL) at the Interdisciplinary Center Herzliya, Israel. He has been invited to present his works at festivals and museums in Israel and overseas, including at the Hamburg Symphony Orchestra, the Radio Filharmonisch Orkest, Maison européenne de la photographie in Paris, the Centro-Historico Festival (Mexico), Bath International Music Festival (England), Kaserne (Switzerland), the Bartok Festival (Hungary), and the Nakanojo Biennale (Japan).

In 2017, he taught a winter semester at the Design and Media department at UCLA.

Since 2016, Landau has been pursuing a PhD at the Aalto University Media Lab in Helsinki.

Landau has lectured worldwide at major universities and various conferences and festivals, including at Stanford University, California

, California Institute of Technology

, San Diego State University

, Shenzhen Fair, China

, RIXC Festival, Latvia

, Israel Society of Biological Psychiatry

, B3 Biennale, Frankfurt

, Haifa Film Festival, Israel,

and the Czech National Library of Technology

Personal life
Landau's sister, Sigalit Landau, is also an artist.

Landau is married to Michal Openheim Landau, a musician, composer, and vocal teacher. They live in Tel Aviv.

Selected exhibitions and presentations
 1995 – Abstract on Black /  interactive presentation of video-dance music / Jerusalem, Amsterdam
 1996 – Stair Music / 8-minute music / Phenomena Festival / Jerusalem
 1997 – A Car and a Bench / 60-minute dance music / choreography by Yasmeen Godder
 1998 – Losing It Again / 7-minute Music for piano and electronics / Amsterdam, Paris and New York
 1999 – Ana Shahid – I Witness / 45-minute show / The Netherlands
 2001 – Eye Drum / 4-minute video / in collaboration with Sigalit Landau / The Israel Museum
 2001 – Scratch / 8-minute video / Mexico, The Netherlands 
 2002 – The Worlds of Milosh / 70-minute show / Mexico, The Netherlands, Germany
 2003 – Ana Shahid / work for ensemble, canon and objects, 11 minutes / The Netherlands
 2003 – Grid City / 45-minute show / Premiere at the Bath International Music Festival / England 
 2003 – Planeta Kennel / 10-minute video / Sitges Film Festival, Spain 
 2004 – Channel Shabab / 70-minute show / The Netherlands, Hungary, Germany 
 2004 – lDeadly Affairs / 50-minute show / Netherlands Philharmonic Orchestra / The Netherlands
 2004 – Peace in Our Time / 5-minute video / broadcast on Nachtpodium VPRO / The Netherlands
 2005 – Anna Frank, Bat-Yam / 22-minute video / Reshut HaRabim / Jaffa
 2005 – Eye Drum / 4-minute video / Omanut HaAretz / Reading, Tel Aviv
 2005 – For your eyes only / 10-minute video / Reshut HaRabim / Jaffa
 2006 – Mexico-Berlin / video 6'21" / Seduction / Bayit BaNamal, Tel Aviv
 2007 – Ana Shahid | Ensemble, Objects & Computer | Opéra Bastille, Paris 
 2008 – Ana Bat Yam / 20-minute video / Birshut HaRabim, Tel Aviv
 2009 – Pulsing Chambers – 60-minute video performance / The Netherlands
 2009 – One-Dimensional Man / 62-minute show / Suzanne Dellal Center for Dance and Theater
 2010 – Dir El Balach / 15-minute installation / The Israel Museum
 2010 – From Canyons to Stars / video triptych and orchestra / 110 minutes / Hamburg 
 2010 – Not Very Nice People / 22-minute installation / The Israeli Digital Art Center, Holon 
 2011 – Reside 1.1: Jessie Cohen / 65-minute show / premiere at Kaserne Basel, Switzerland 
 2011 – Reside 1.2: King Faisal 57 / 20-minute installation / Loving Art, Tel Aviv, Yehuda HaYamit 
 2012 – Not Very Nice People / 8-minute video / Maison européenne de la photographie, Paris 
 2012 – Reside 1.4: Mount Zion-Darfur / 30-minute installation / Loving Art, Tel Aviv 
 2012 – The Nature of Things / 4-minute video / the Israel Museum, Jerusalem, Ron Arad installation 
 2013 – Make a Wish / site-specific light installation, Habima Square, Tel Aviv 
 2014 – Open Skies / 5-minute video / Circle One, Berlin 
 2014 – 30-minute Reside 1.4 / interactive installation, Artport, Tel Aviv 
 2014 – Ceci n'est pas une narguile / 7-minute video mapping / Acco Festival of Alternative Israeli Theatre
 2014 – Eye Drum / 6-minute video / The Israel Museum, Jerusalem 
 2014 – HeLa / Curator of a group exhibition at Hayarkon 19 – Oh Man Oh Machine project 
 2015 – Cave Study / video installation 360, Tel Aviv Museum: Isu Tori Game / video installation, Nakanojo Biennale, Japan 
 2015 – I will be right back / 55-minute video installation for a dance show, in collaboration with Iris Erez 
 2016 – The Perfect Post-Human / Video installation, London Roundhouse
 2016 – Time Body Experiment / Performative experiment, PrintScreen Festival 
 2016 – Time Motion Study / Video installation 360, in collaboration with Arkadi Zaides, The James Gallery, New York 
 2017 – Self-Study_01 | VR performance | B3 Film Festival, Frankfurt 
 2018 – Visitors | media installation | Israel Museum, Jerusalem 
 2019 – Self-Study_02 | Open Lab performance | CCA, Tel Aviv

Sources

External links
 

Israeli video artists
Israeli artists
Jewish artists
Israeli people of Romanian-Jewish descent
Royal Conservatory of The Hague alumni